Criminal Code of the Republic of Lithuania is the Criminal Code of Lithuania, the prime source of Law of Lithuania concerning criminal offences.

The Criminal Code came into force together with the Code of Criminal Process, Code of Punishment Execution and Code of Administrative Offenses.

The previous Criminal Code of the Lithuanian Soviet Socialist Republic came into force on 26 July 1961. After the declaration of independence in March 1990, a soviet criminal code was adopted in December 1991. In 2003, the new Criminal Code came into effect.

See also
 Capital punishment in Lithuania
 Civil Code of Lithuania

External links
 Criminal code of the Republic of Lithuania, outdated English version
 Norvaisaite, Elona (February 2005) A guide to the Lithuanian legal system and research

Bibliography 
 Armanas Abramavičius, Agnė Baranskaitė, Algimantas Čepas, Romualdas Drakšas, Anna Drakšienė, Oleg Fedosiuk, Girius Ivoška, Antanas Jatkevičius, Albertas Milinis, Vytas Milius, Vladas Pavilonis, Jonas Prapiestis, Deividas Soloveičikas, Gintautas Šulija, Gintaras Švedas (Editor-in-chief: Jonas Prapiestis): Lietuvos Respublikos baudžiamojo kodekso komentaras I dalis. 1st Edition: 1-98. Teisinės informacijos centras, Vilnius 2004, .
 Egidijus Bieliūnas, Gintaras Švedas, Armanas Abramavičius: Lietuvos Respublikos baudžiamojo kodekso komentaras. 2nd Edition:  99–212. Registrų centras, Vilnius 2009, .
 Egidijus Bieliūnas, Gintaras Švedas, Armanas Abramavičius: Lietuvos Respublikos baudžiamojo kodekso komentaras. 3rd Edition: 213-330. Registrų centras, Vilnius  2010, .

Lit
Criminal code